Germán Frers, Sr. (born July 4, 1941, in Argentina) is a naval architect renowned for designing successful racing yachts. He designed his first yacht in 1958. There is a design team consisting of Germán Frers and his son Germán Frers, Jr., supported by a team of engineers, architects and designers, some of whom have been with the company for more than 25 years. The company has designed more than 1,000 yachts. The designs range from exotic super yachts to no-nonsense racing hulls.

Yachts designed by the Frers team have won many different yachting events around the world including: the Admiral's Cup, Onion Patch, Bermuda Race, Transpacific, Whitbread Round the World Race, Sardinia Cup, Buenos Aires-Rio Race, S.O.R.C. (Southern Ocean Racing Circuit), Kenwood Cup, Copa del Rey, San Francisco Big Boat Series, Giraglia Race, Settimana delle Bocche, Two Ton Cup World Championship, Martini Middle Sea Race and the Maxi World Championship.

Successful yachts designed by Frers include: Scaramouche I and II, Noryema X, Recluta, Hitchhiker, Retaliation I and II, Ragamuffin IV and V, Congere, Morning Star 45', Morning Star 50', Bribon IV and V, Nitissima, Enteara, Volcano, Kodiak, Flyer, Bumblebee III and IV, Guia 2000, Boomerang, Kialoa V, Ondine VIII, Matador and Il Moro di Venezia I, II and III.

His largest project was Jim Clark's 156 ft Hyperion, launched in 1997 at the Royal Huisman yard. At the time of her launch, Hyperion was the largest sloop ever made; Her mast was the tallest ever made as well as the longest single piece carbonfiber object.

Frers is married to Delfina Serralunga Pes. Their daughter, Delfina Frers, is a racing driver. Frers' son Germán "Mani" is also a yacht designer and is responsible for a sister-company headquartered in the city of Milan which is currently tasked with creating the largest sloop in history.

Boat designs

ARA Fortuna III
Beneteau
Cirrus 3/4 (IOR 3/4 ton; built by Taylor Santander, ES (former shipyard in Spain (seized in 1985)); external link to Cirrus 3/4 page on histoire des halves (largest IOR race sailboat encyclopedia on the Internet)
CS 50
CS 395
Dufour Yachts
Nautor's Swan
Hallberg-Rassy
Hallberg-Rassy 31 from 1992
Hallberg-Rassy 310
Hallberg-Rassy 34 from 1990
Hallberg-Rassy 342 from 2005
Hallberg-Rassy 36
Hallberg-Rassy 37
Hallberg-Rassy 372 from 2009
Hallberg-Rassy 39 from 1990
Hallberg-Rassy 40
Hallberg-Rassy 412
Hallberg-Rassy 42 from 1991
Hallberg-Rassy 43 from 2001
Hallberg-Rassy 45
Hallberg-Rassy 46 from 1995
Hallberg-Rassy 48
Hallberg-Rassy 53 from 1996
Hallberg-Rassy 54
Hallberg-Rassy 55
Hallberg-Rassy 62
Hallberg-Rassy 64 from 2011
Kong & Halvorsen
Dawn 48
Dawn 41
Hinterhoeller F3
Niagara 31
Pandora (former shipyard in Argentina)
Pandora 23
Pandora 27
Pandora 28
Pandora 31
Wally Yachts
Mystic Yachts
Hylas Yachts
D`Angelo 24
Numerous large yachts, see list of large sailing yachts

See also
List of sailboat designers and manufacturers

References

Best Boats to Build or Buy Ferenc Máté, Albatross Publishing House, 1982

 
Argentine yacht designers
Living people
1941 births
Frers family